The 1976 Nations motorcycle Grand Prix was the third round of the 1976 Grand Prix motorcycle racing season. It took place on 16 May 1976 at the Mugello circuit. Otello Buscherini suffered a fatal accident on lap 6 of the 250cc race and was killed.

500cc classification

350 cc classification

Footnotes

250 cc classification

Footnotes

125 cc classification

50 cc classification

References

Italian motorcycle Grand Prix
Nations Grand Prix
Nations Grand Prix